Prosec or Proseč may refer to:

Prosec Mexico, an economic program

Places in the Czech Republic
Proseč, a town in the Pardubice Region
Proseč (Pelhřimov District), a municipality and village in the Vysočina Region
Proseč, a village and administrative part of Kámen, Vysočina Region
Proseč, a village and administrative part of Pošná, Vysočina Region
Proseč, a village and administrative part of Seč, Pardubice Region
Proseč, a village and administrative part of Záhoří, Liberec Region
Proseč, a village and administrative part of Žernov, Liberec Region